Malin Rundgren (born 8 August 1965) is a Swedish swimmer. She competed in the women's 4 × 100 metre freestyle relay at the 1984 Summer Olympics.

References

External links
 

1965 births
Living people
Olympic swimmers of Sweden
Swimmers at the 1984 Summer Olympics
Sportspeople from Lund
Swedish female freestyle swimmers
20th-century Swedish women